Nancy Caswell (October 28, 1913 – February 2, 1987) was an American child actress of the silent era and later as an adult in talkies, including a Three Stooges work. As a baby she was proclaimed the "perfect baby" and was the youngest actress, with roles when she was as young as three.

Selected filmography
 Riders of the Purple Sage (1918)
 The Day She Paid (1919)
 The Mother of His Children (1920)
 The Two-Fisted Lover (1920)
 Under Crimson Skies (1920)
 Shore Acres (1920)
 The Flame of Life (1923)
 Scareheads (1931)
 Horses' Collars (1935)
 Custer's Last Stand (1936)

References

External links
 

1913 births
1987 deaths
American film actresses
American silent film actresses
Actresses from Los Angeles
20th-century American actresses
American child actresses